Robie H. Harris is an American author, specializing in books for children. She was born in Buffalo, New York.

Harris wrote several children's books about childbirth and human sexuality, including It's Perfectly Normal and It's so Amazing, two of the American Library Association's most-challenged books of the 21st century. She is a cousin of children's author Elizabeth Levy. She graduated from Wheaton College and the Bank Street College of Education. She won the 2019 Mathical Book Prize for her book Crash! Boom! A Math Tale.

References

External links

Year of birth missing (living people)
Living people
Wheaton College (Massachusetts) alumni
Bank Street College of Education alumni
American children's writers